Secheon station is a railway station on the Gyeongbu Line in Daejeon, South Korea.

Railway stations in Daejeon